Despina may refer to:

People 
 Despina Delios, American beauty pageant contestant
 Despina Stratigakos (born 1963), Canadian-born architectural historian and academic
 Despina Vandi (born 1969), Greek singer
 Olivera Despina ( – after 1444), Serbian princess and Ottoman queen consort
 Milica Despina of Wallachia ( – 1554), Princess consort of Wallachia

Other uses 
 Despoina, a figure in Greek mythology
 Despina (moth), a genus of moth
 Despina (moon), a moon of Neptune
 Despina, a character in Mozart's opera Così fan tutte
 "Despoina", a song by Nikos Karvelas

Greek feminine given names